Welsh singer and songwriter Duffy has released two studio albums, six extended plays (under the name of Duffy) and one extended play (under the name of Aimée Duffy), seven singles and seven music videos. Her discography began with the release of one Welsh language extended play using her birth name, Aimée Duffy, and she has appeared on two soundtrack albums, as well as on a studio album by Mint Royale in 2004.
Duffy's range of musical genres incorporates styles such as blue-eyed soul, pop and pop rock. Aimée Duffy, her debut extended play (EP), was released in 2004 by Welsh music label Recordiau Awen Records, following her success on the Welsh talent show WawFfactor in 2003. Following this release, a performance of Richard J. Parfitt's "Oh Boy" brought her to the attention of Duffy's former manager, Jeanette Lee of Rough Trade Records.

Her debut single, "Rockferry", was released in late 2007, and charted at number 45 on the UK Singles Chart. Her follow-up single, "Mercy", was internationally released, charting inside the top ten on 15 international singles charts, as well as reaching number one on eight of these. "Mercy" was the third-biggest-selling single of 2008 in the United Kingdom. This came after staying at number one on the UK Singles Chart for five weeks. Duffy's debut album Rockferry, was released on 3 March 2008, and became the biggest selling album of that year in the UK. Her follow-up singles, "Warwick Avenue" and "Stepping Stone", did not replicate her early success, although they still sold well; for example "Warwick Avenue" charted at number 3 on the UK Singles Chart. Her fifth single, "Rain on Your Parade", was released in December 2008. Rockferry was the fourth-best-selling album of 2008 worldwide, according to the International Federation of the Phonographic Industry, and since its release the album has sold over six million copies worldwide. The album won the Grammy Award for Best Pop Vocal Album at the 51st Annual Grammy Awards.

Duffy released her second album, titled Endlessly on 29 November 2010, which to date has charted in most major markets. The lead single from the album, "Well, Well, Well", was released on 21 November 2010, to moderate success. Duffy also contributed three songs in total to the film soundtracks of The Boat That Rocked and Welsh film Patagonia, the latter in which she starred. In 2015, Duffy contributed three songs to the soundtrack of the film Legend in which she played Timi Yuro. The songs included her first single following a five-year hiatus from releasing music, titled "Whole Lot of Love".

Studio albums

Extended plays

Singles

Promotional singles

Other charted songs

Other appearances
The following have been officially released, but are not featured on a main release by Duffy.

Music videos

Live versions of seven songs from Endlessly recorded at the Café de Paris were also released as music videos. A video was filmed for the prospective single "My Boy", but was never released.

References

Notes

Sources
General

Specific

External links
Official website

Duffy (singer)
Discographies of British artists
Rhythm and blues discographies
Pop music discographies
Soul music discographies